Kimberly Drewniok (Born 11 August 1997) is a German volleyball player. She participated in the 2018 FIVB Volleyball Women's Nations League.

Career 
Drewniok began her career at RC Sorpesee, with which she rose to the third division. 
In 2014, she moved to the VC Olympia Berlin junior team, and played in the Bundesliga. 
In the 2016/17 season, played for VC Potsdam, who reached the quarter-finals. 
She moved to league rivals 1. VC Wiesbaden.

References

External links 
 http://www.volleyball.world/en/women/teams/ger-germany/players/kimberly-drewniok?id=64226
 https://www.vc-wiesbaden.de/bundesliga-damen/das-team-des-vcw/199-volleyball-bundesliga-damen/bundesliga-team-2016-2017/2984-kimberly-drewniok.html
 http://www.wiesbadener-tagblatt.de/sport/volleyball/vc-wiesbaden/kimberly-drewniok-will-mit-deutschland-zur-wm_18686388.htm
 http://www.wiesbadener-kurier.de/sport/volleyball/vc-wiesbaden/wechsel-zoff-beim-vc-wiesbaden-kimberly-drewniok-sorgt-fuer-aerger-und-spielt-kuenftig-fuer-schwerin_18795665.htm
 

1997 births
Living people
German women's volleyball players
People from Märkischer Kreis
Sportspeople from Arnsberg (region)